Acrotaeniostola is a genus of tephritid or fruit flies in the family Tephritidae.

Species
Acrotaeniostola apiventris Munro, 1935
Acrotaeniostola dissimilis Zia, 1937
Acrotaeniostola extorris Hering, 1942
Acrotaeniostola flavoscutellata Shiraki, 1933
Acrotaeniostola fuscinotum Hering, 1938
Acrotaeniostola helvenaca Ito, 1984
Acrotaeniostola hoenei Hering, 1936
Acrotaeniostola interrupta Hardy, 1988
Acrotaeniostola longicauda Wang, 1996
Acrotaeniostola megispilota Hardy, 1974
Acrotaeniostola pieli Zia, 1937
Acrotaeniostola quadrifasciata (Enderlein, 1911)
Acrotaeniostola quinaria (Coquillett, 1910)
Acrotaeniostola sexvittata Hendel, 1914
Acrotaeniostola spiralis Munro, 1935
Acrotaeniostola yunnana Wang, 1996

References

Dacinae
Tephritidae genera
Diptera of Asia